Scott Campbell  may refer to:

Scott Campbell (American football) (born 1962), former American football quarterback
Scott Campbell (artist) (born 1973), production designer and illustrator
Scott Campbell (tattoo artist) (born 1977), American artist
Scott Campbell (author) (born 1945), American writer
Scott Campbell (baseball) (born 1984), New Zealander retired minor league baseball player
Scott Campbell (ice hockey, born 1957), Canadian ormer defenceman in the WHA and NHL
Scott Campbell (ice hockey, born 1972), Scottish ice hockey defenceman
Scott Campbell (ice hockey, born 1986), Canadian professional ice hockey player
Scott Campbell (musician) (born 1958), American composer and actor
Scott Michael Campbell (born 1971), American actor, writer and producer
J. Scott Campbell (born 1973), American comic book artist
Scott Campbell (politician), member of the Vermont House of Representatives